James Goodall (1860 – 22 September 1942) was a member of the New Zealand Legislative Council from 9 March 1936 to 22 September 1942, when he died. He was appointed by the First Labour Government.

He was from Greymouth.

References 

1860 births
1942 deaths
Members of the New Zealand Legislative Council
New Zealand Labour Party MLCs
People from Greymouth